Yury Sokolov may refer to:

 Yury Sokolov (boxer) (born 1929), Russian boxer
 Yury Sokolov (judoka) (1961–1990), Soviet judoka